Herald is a census-designated place in Sacramento County, California. It is located east of the city of Galt along State Route 104. The ZIP Code is 95638, and the community is inside area code 209. The 2010 United States census reported that Herald's population was 1,184.

The now-decommissioned 918MW Rancho Seco Nuclear Generating Station was built in Herald; its site is now the location of the 1000MW gas-fired Cosumnes Power Plant and an 11 MW solar installation. The nuclear plant's disused cooling towers remain standing, and are the largest buildings in California's Central Valley.  Nearby Rancho Seco Recreational Park features a lake originally created to serve as an emergency backup water supply for the plant.

Geography
According to the United States Census Bureau, the CDP covers an area of 7.9 square miles (20.5 km2), 99.72% of it land and 0.28% of it water.

Demographics

The 2010 United States Census reported that Herald had a population of 1,184. The racial makeup of Herald was 934 (78.9%) White, 20 (1.7%) African American, 13 (1.1%) Native American, 64 (5.4%) Asian, 7 (0.6%) Pacific Islander, 105 (8.9%) from other races, and 41 (3.5%) from two or more races. Hispanic or Latino of any race were 254 persons (21.5%).

The Census reported that 1,105 people (93.3% of the population) lived in households, 79 (6.7%) lived in non-institutionalized group quarters, and 0 (0%) were institutionalized.

There were 350 households, out of which 142 (40.6%) had children under the age of 18 living in them, 260 (74.3%) were opposite-sex married couples living together, 27 (7.7%) had a female householder with no husband present, 20 (5.7%) had a male householder with no wife present.  There were 14 (4.0%) unmarried opposite-sex partnerships, and 2 (0.6%) same-sex married couples or partnerships. 37 households (10.6%) were made up of individuals, and 15 (4.3%) had someone living alone who was 65 years of age or older. The average household size was 3.16.  There were 307 families (87.7% of all households); the average family size was 3.29.

The population was spread out, with 269 people (22.7%) under the age of 18, 102 people (8.6%) aged 18 to 24, 243 people (20.5%) aged 25 to 44, 411 people (34.7%) aged 45 to 64, and 159 people (13.4%) who were 65 years of age or older.  The median age was 43.4 years. For every 100 females, there were 114.9 males.  For every 100 females age 18 and over, there were 115.3 males.

The homeowner vacancy rate was 2.3%; the rental vacancy rate was 3.5%.  930 people (78.5% of the population) lived in owner-occupied housing units and 175 people (14.8%) lived in rental housing units.

Government

References

Census-designated places in Sacramento County, California
Census-designated places in California